Zooperstars is a 2010 Philippine television informative show broadcast by GMA Network. Hosted by Gelli de Belen, Julian Trono and Sabrina Man, it premiered on February 28, 2010. The show concluded on June 27, 2010 with a total of 18 episodes.

Ratings
According to AGB Nielsen Philippines' Mega Manila household television ratings, the pilot episode of Zooperstars earned a 10.2% rating.

References

External links
 

2010 Philippine television series debuts
2010 Philippine television series endings
Filipino-language television shows
GMA Network original programming
Philippine television shows